Khachatur-Bek of Mush was an Armenian Bek in the first half of the 19th century, a prominent representative of the family of Ter-Khachatryants family. He was from the town Mush of Western Armenia. His family house was in the Surb Marineh Church's (Saint Marine) quarter in Mush.  His grandfather was Daniel-Bek of Sassun, an Armenian Bek from Sassun (the province Sassun or Sason of Western Armenia) in the second half of the 18th century). Khachar (1937–1993) and his son Garegin Khachatryan (1975–1995), both prominent artists active in Armenian liberation, were descendants of their House. 

Armenians from the Ottoman Empire
Armenian politicians
Year of birth missing
Year of death missing